The Patras–Kyparissia railway is a railway line of the OSE in Achaea, Elis, and Messenia, southwestern Greece. This 163 km long single track metre-gauge line connects Patras, Pyrgos and Kyparissia.

Connections
The Patras–Kyparissia railway is connected to the following other railway lines:
at Patras to the Piraeus–Patras railway
at Kavasila to the (abandoned) Kavasila–Kyllini railway
at Pyrgos to Katakolo
at Alfeios to Olympia
at Kalo Nero to Zevgolateio

There was a ferry connection from Patras to Kryoneri, the southern terminus of the (now abandoned) railway line to Missolonghi and Agrinio.

History
Construction of the line was started in May 1887. The first section from Patras to Kato Achaia was opened in 1888, and to Pyrgos in 1890. Kyparissia was reached in 1902.  Since January 2011, passenger traffic on most of the line has been suspended.

Current use
Currently, only two sections of the railway are in use:
Patras–Agios Andreas (as part of the Patras suburban railway)
Pyrgos–Alfeios (tourist trains from Katakolo to Olympia)

References

External links
Friendly Associations of Greek Railways site 
Official website of the Hellenic Railways Organisation (OSE)
TRAINOSE website

Railway lines in Greece
Achaea
Elis
Messenia
Metre gauge railways in Greece
Railway lines opened in 1889
1889 establishments in Greece
2011 disestablishments in Greece